Austins Bridge is the debut album from the band of the same name, which was released on February 27, 2007.

Critical reception

Crosswalk writes, "Austins Bridge is as country and Southern gospel as you can get, and then some."

Track listing

Awards
In 2008, the album was nominated for a Dove Award for Country Album of the Year at the 39th GMA Dove Awards. The song "He's In Control" won a Dove Award for Bluegrass Recorded Song of the Year that same year.

References

External links 
 Austins Bridge Official Site
 
 Austins Bridge at Amazon.com

2007 debut albums
Austins Bridge albums